Kwaheri, also known as Kwaheri: Vanishing Africa or Kwaheri: The Forbidden, is a 1964 mondo film directed by David Chudnow and Thor Brooks.  The film was a pseudo-documentary about vanishing native tribes in Africa. Kwaheri means Goodbye in Swahili.

As the film focused more on the controversial aspects of the tribal societies, it gained the attention of exploitation filmmakers, including Kroger Babb, whose Hallmark Productions distribution company acquired the American rights.

External links and references
 IMDb.
 "Kroger Babb to Handle Kwaheri in 11 States," BoxOffice, 26 April 1965.

American mockumentary films
1964 films
Mondo films
1960s English-language films
1960s American films